Austrocheirus is an extinct genus of theropod dinosaur, possibly a neoceratosaurian, which existed during the Late Cretaceous period. It was named and described by Martin Ezcurra, Federico Agnolin and Fernando Novas in 2010. It contains the type species Austrocheirus isasii. The generic name means "southern hand". The specific epithet honours discoverer and preparator Marcelo Pablo Isasi.

The fossils were found on 17 March 2002 in the Pari Aike Formation, which was originally dated to the Maastrichtian, around 71 to 66 million years ago, but was more recently dated to the Cenomanian, around 96.2 million years ago. However, this strata is now believed to date to the Campanian. These fossils consist of a partial manus (hand), a tibia, axial bones, and a foot bone.

In 2016, its length was estimated to be . In 2012 Holtz estimated it at 6.5 meters (24 feet), while in 2016 Molina-Pérez & Larramendi gave a higher estimation at 9.3 meters (30.5 feet) in length and 1 tonne (1.1 short tons) in weight.

A cladistic analysis indicated Austrocheirus had a basal position in the Abelisauroidea, but was more derived than Ceratosaurus and Berberosaurus. This would make it the first known mid-sized abelisauroid which did not possess the reduced forelimbs seen in other members of that clade.

The referral of Austrocheirus to Abelisauroidea was challenged by Oliver Rauhut (2012), who claimed that the putative abelisauroid synapomorphies used to justify this referral are actually also present in the skeletons of non-abelisauroid theropods. Thus, according to Rauhut Austrocheirus can be only classified as a theropod dinosaur of uncertain phylogenetic placement.

See also 

 Timeline of ceratosaur research

References 

Ceratosaurs
Late Cretaceous dinosaurs of South America
Cenomanian life
Cretaceous Argentina
Fossils of Argentina
Fossil taxa described in 2010
Taxa named by Fernando Novas